The Family of Mr. Westfal in the Conservatory is an early 19th-century painting by German artist Eduard Gaertner. A wealthy Berlin merchant known for his love of horticulture, Westphal was also Gaertner's landlord. The small painting is one of only four interior scenes painted by Gaertner. It was acquired by the Metropolitan Museum of Art in 2007, and remains in the museum's collection.

The sitters in the painting are Emilie Eleonore Dorothee Schultze, Westphal's second wife, and the couple's three children.

References

Further reading 
Selection of Met acquisitions including the painting.
Tweet by the Metropolitan Museum of Art regarding the painting.

1836 paintings
Plants in art
Paintings in the collection of the Metropolitan Museum of Art